is a Japanese butterfly swimmer.

Major achievements 
2007 World Championships
 50 m butterfly 10th (26.91)
2008 Beijing Olympics
 100 m butterfly 23rd (58.94)
 4 × 100 m medley relay 6th (Heat 3:59.91, Final 3:59.54)
2012 London Olympics
 100 m butterfly 11th 
 4 x 100 m medley relay 3rd

Personal Bests 
In long course
 50 m butterfly: 26.07 Japanese Record (April 10, 2011)
 100 m butterfly: 57:80 former Japanese Record (April 11, 2011)
In short course
 50 m butterfly: 25.34 Japanese Record (10 November 2013)
 100 m butterfly: 56.09 Japanese Record (9 November 2013)

References 

 http://www.joc.or.jp/beijing/athlete/aquatics/katoyuka.html

1986 births
Living people
Olympic swimmers of Japan
Japanese female butterfly swimmers
Swimmers at the 2008 Summer Olympics
Swimmers at the 2012 Summer Olympics
People from Toyokawa, Aichi
Sportspeople from Aichi Prefecture
Olympic bronze medalists for Japan
Olympic bronze medalists in swimming
Asian Games medalists in swimming
Swimmers at the 2006 Asian Games
Swimmers at the 2010 Asian Games
Medalists at the 2012 Summer Olympics
Universiade medalists in swimming
Asian Games silver medalists for Japan
Asian Games bronze medalists for Japan
Medalists at the 2006 Asian Games
Medalists at the 2010 Asian Games
Universiade gold medalists for Japan
Medalists at the 2007 Summer Universiade
21st-century Japanese women